Z. gracilis may refer to:
 Zopherus gracilis, a beetle species
 Zygodon gracilis, a moss species

See also
 Gracilis (disambiguation)